Amaravati Seed Capital Road or ASC Road is an ongoing arterial flyover road project and a part of Amaravati Seed Access Road Network to connect the city of Vijayawada with Amaravati.

Phase–I 

References 

Roads in Amaravati
Proposed roads in India
Transport in Vijayawada